Ethel Reed (March 13, 1874 – 1912) was an American graphic artist. In the 1890s, her works received critical acclaim in America and Europe. In 2016 they were on exhibit in the Metropolitan Museum of Art and Museum of Modern Art in New York, the National Museum of American History in Washington, D.C., the Fine Arts Museums of San Francisco, the Frederick R. Weisman Art Museum of the University of Minnesota in Minneapolis, and the Nelson-Atkins Museum of Art in Kansas City.

Early life and career
Ethel Reed was born in Newburyport, Massachusetts, on March 13, 1874. She was the daughter of a local photographer, Edgar Eugene Reed, and Elizabeth Mahoney, an Irish immigrant. Her father died in 1892, and Ethel and her mother consequently suffered hardship. After they moved to Boston in 1890, she studied briefly at the Cowles Art School in 1893, and after 1894 began to receive public notice for her illustrations. Reed's youthful beauty and cleverness caught the attention of a Newburyport artist Laura Hills, who became a mentor. During her time in Boston, she achieved national fame as a poster artist while still in her early twenties. She did many series of posters and book illustrations during a span of less than two years. In the mid-1890s she was engaged to fellow artist Philip Leslie Hale, whose father Edward Everett Hale was a prominent Bostonian. However, the engagement was broken off. In 1896, she traveled Europe with her mother. In 1897 they settled in London where Reed worked as an illustrator, in particular for the Yellow Book, a quarterly literary periodical, which was co-founded by Aubrey Beardsley. She had two children with different lovers.

She was acquainted with important literary and artistic figures of her day: the writer Richard le Gallienne, the architects Bertram Goodhue and Ralph Adams Cram, the photographer Fred Holland Day. Ethel Reed was the model for Day's photographs Chloe and The Gainsborough Hat. She also modeled at least three times for portraits by Frances Benjamin Johnston.

In her short career, Ethel Reed achieved recognition as one of the preeminent illustrator artists of her time and remains one of the most mysterious figures of American graphic design.

Later life and death 
Reed was unable to find work after moving to Europe; she turned to drugs and alcohol after years of disappointment. Her circumstances in England are difficult to trace, and certain records of her final years have yet to surface. However, according to recent research, she died in her sleep in 1912.  Her biographer has asserted that alcoholism and the use of sleeping medications contributed to her death.

Works illustrated

Boston Sunday Herald (1895)
Boston Illustrated (1895)
Lily Lewis Rood, Pierre Puvis de Chavannes: A Sketch (Boston: L. Prang & Co., 1895)
Albert Morris Bagby, Miss Träumerei: A Weimar Idyl (Boston: Lamson, Wolffe & Co., 1895)
Gertrude Smith, The Arabella and Araminta Stories (Boston: Copeland & Day, 1895)
Julia Ward Howe, Is Polite Society Polite? (Boston: Lamson, Wolffe & Co., 1895)
Charles Knowles Bolton, The Love Story of Ursula Wolcott (Boston: Lamson, Wolffe, & Co., 1896)
Mabel Fuller Blodgett, Fairy Tales (Boston: Lamson, Wolffe, & Co., 1896)
Louise Chandler Moulton, In Childhood's Country (Boston: Copeland & Day, 1896)
Time and the Hour, (1896)
Richard Le Gallienne, The Quest of the Golden Girl: A Romance (London: John Lane, 1897)
The Yellow Book, Volumes XII (January, 1897) and XIII (April, 1897)
Agnes Lee, The Round Rabbit and Other Child Verse (Boston: Copeland & Day, 1898). 
The Sketch, Volume 21 (6 April 1898)

References

External links

Ethel Reed Prints & Photographs Online Catalog of the Library of Congress
Ethel Reed New York Public Library Digital Collection
Ethel Reed Ask Art
The Evanescent Miss Ethel Reed
Ethel Reed Information about her life and artistic career
The Beautiful Poster Lady An Interview with William S. Peterson, Professor Emeritus of English at the University of Maryland
Ethel Reed, The Beautiful Poster Lady. Webcast from the Rare Book and Special Collections Division at the Library of Congress

American graphic designers
Women graphic designers
Book designers
People from Newburyport, Massachusetts
1874 births
1912 deaths
Artists from Massachusetts
19th-century American artists
19th-century American women artists
20th-century American artists
20th-century American women artists
American women illustrators
American illustrators